Dulce Ilusión (English title:Sweet Illusion) is a Venezuelan telenovela written by Mariela Romero and produced by Radio Caracas Televisión in 1993. This was the first telenovela to use Venezuelan cartoons with real people, and it's the only one in the history of Venezuelan soap operas, and the great success of the telenovela was partly due to the big innovation of the cartoons. The animated characters were developed by the legendary animator Felix Nakamura and his team.

Coraima Torres and Gabriel Fernández  starred as the main protagonists with the antagonistic participation of Marisela Berti.

Synopsis
Dulce María was born in the midst of the tropics, and when her parents die, she becomes the heiress to their lands and vast fortune. However, her ruthless governess Zarina robs her of her rightful inheritance and raises Dulce María as a servant in her own home, convincing her that she had been born a penniless orphan.

Despite her stepmother's cruelty, Dulce María grows to become a young woman full of optimism and innocence. Her genuine nature wins the hearts of many of the townspeople, especially the local children. Among these is Caraotica, an unforgettable boy with strange powers; in reality, Caraotica is an angel who inadvertently "fell" into the convent's backyard while on a mission from heaven to Villa del Mar. Sor Ada, the nun who educated Dulce María, becomes her confidante and greatest source of moral support. In her youth, Sor Ada had experienced everything from hunting tigers in the wild to singing classic love ballads, and thus instills in Dulce María a pronounced idealism and zest for life. It is through this that  Dulce María becomes a dreamer; a young girl who shares her dreams and adventures with imaginary characters: a lively lizard named Homero, symbol of emotion; the toucan Prometeo symbol of reason; and the coquettish canary Alicia Josefina, symbol of love. One day, Dulce María is reunited with her childhood sweetheart Juan Francisco, a recently graduated military cadet. This marks the beginning of a passionate love story; one which will be threatened by envy, jealousy, and blind ambition. However, with the help of Jacques Delfin, a mysterious and eccentric man who lives on a yacht off the coast of Villa del Mar, Dulce María and Juan Francisco will finally unravel the secret of her birthright and find true love.

Cast
Coraima Torres as Dulce María
Gabriel Fernandez as Juan Francisco Corona
Carlos Arreaza as El Junior
Janin Barboza as Sor Angustia
Marisela Berti as Zarina
Ricardo Bianchi as Gustavo Ríos Ibáñez
Jose Daniel Bort as Andy Perez Matos
Marcos Campos as Arturo Tracala
Crisol Carabal as Sarita
Sebastian Falco as  Giuseppe
Felix Loreto as Justo Corona
Dora Mazzone as Egleé Bustillo
Jonathan Montenegro as Lalo
Martha Pabón as Marquesita
Jorge Palacios as Don Tomás
Henry Soto as Jacques Delfín
Raul Gonzales Voice of Lizard Homero

References

External links
Dulce Ilusión at the Internet Movie Database
Opening credits

1993 telenovelas
RCTV telenovelas
Venezuelan telenovelas
1993 Venezuelan television series debuts
1993 Venezuelan television series endings
Spanish-language telenovelas
Television shows set in Chile